Baal-hanan (Hebrew: בַּעַל חָנָן / בָּעַל חָנָן, Standard Baʿal Ḥanan Tiberian Baʿal Ḥānān / Bāʿal Ḥānān) means "Baal has been gracious". There are two men by this name in the Hebrew Bible.

In , Baal-hanan is a King of Edom. He succeeded Shaul and was himself succeeded by Hadad. He was the son of Achbor.

He is called the son of Achbor; but the name of his native city is not given. For this and other reasons, Marqaurt supposes that "son of Achbor" is a duplicate of "son of Beor" (Gen. 36:32), and that "Baal-hanan" in the original text is given as the name of the father of the next king, Hadar.

The date and even historicity of his reign are unknown, as he is not mentioned in any other surviving source.

In the Books of Chronicles there is also a second man by this name, from the city of Geder. In  he is described as being responsible to King David for the care of olive and sycamore trees.

References

Book of Genesis people
Kings of Edom